"Zoom"  is a song by Korean-American rapper and singer Jessi. It was released on April 13, 2022, by P Nation and distributed by Kakao Entertainment. An upbeat hip hop and trap song, "Zoom" was written by Jessi, Psy, Bobblehead, and Yumdda and produced by Psy, Yoo Geon-hyung, and Bayb.

"Zoom" was the final release by Jessi under P Nation, as she would depart the label on July 6, 2022.

Background and release 
In October 2021, Jessi released the digital single "Cold Blooded", in collaboration with the Mnet reality show Street Woman Fighter. In March 2022, P Nation then announced that she would be coming back with a new single that April. The first teaser trailer was released to YouTube on April 11, 2022, followed by a second on April 12. "Zoom" was released to digital music platforms as a single on April 13, 2022.

Composition 
"Zoom" is an upbeat K-pop and hip hop song, inspired by people's desire to be "photographed and get attention from others", which Jessi called "a sad reality" in an interview with NME. The song was written by Jessi, Psy, Bobblehead, and Yumdda and produced by Psy, Yoo Geon-hyung, and Bayb. Running for two minutes and 55 seconds, "Zoom" is composed in the key of F# major and at a tempo of 100 BPM.

Commercial performance 
In South Korea, "Zoom" debuted at number 155 on the Gaon Digital Chart for the issue dated April 10–16, 2022, with 2,350,415 Gaon Index points; on its component charts, the song debuted at number 17 on the Gaon Download Chart for the week dated April 10–16 and number 89 on the Gaon Streaming Chart for the week dated April 17–24. The song later peaked at number 12 on the Gaon Digital Chart for the issue dated May 8–14. "Zoom" peaked at number 76 on the now-defunct K-pop Hot 100 and number nine on South Korea Songs, which replaced the former as part of Billboard's Hits of the World series of record charts. Elsewhere in Asia, "Zoom" peaked at number eight in Indonesia, five in Malaysia, four in the Philippines, five in Singapore, 20 in Taiwan, and 21 in Vietnam.

In New Zealand, "Zoom" debuted and peaked at number 27 on the RMNZ Hot Singles chart, Jessi's second and highest debut on the chart. The song debuted at number seven on the World Digital Song Sales chart. It has since charted for six weeks, being her longest-charting song on the chart. The song debuted at number 163 on the Billboard Global 200 for the issue dated May 1–7, 2022, peaking at number 93 the next week and charting for four total weeks.

Personnel 
 Jessi – vocals, songwriting
 Psy – songwriting, production
 Bobblehead – songwriting
 Yumdda – songwriting
 Yoo Geon-hyung – production, arrangement
 Bayb – production, arrangement
 Lee Ki-ho – recording, digital editing
 Jung Eun-kyung – recording
 Stay Tuned – mixing
 Kwon Nam-woo – mastering

Studio
 Ingrid Studio – recording
 P Nation – recording, digital editing
 Stay Tuned Studio – mixing
 821 Sound – mastering

Charts

Weekly charts

Monthly charts

Year-end charts

Release history

References 

2022 singles
2022 songs
Jessi (musician) songs
Songs written by Psy